The 1963–64 Sheffield Shield season was the 62nd season of the Sheffield Shield, the domestic first-class cricket competition of Australia. South Australia won the championship.

Table

Statistics

Most Runs
Garfield Sobers 973

Most Wickets
Garfield Sobers 47

References

Sheffield Shield
Sheffield Shield
Sheffield Shield seasons